The suprascapular vein is a vein running above the scapula. It drains into the external jugular vein. It drains the posterior region around the scapula.

Structure 
The suprascapular vein runs above the scapula. It runs above the anterior coracospinal ligament. It lies close to the suprascapular artery. It drains into the external jugular vein.

Variation 
The course of the suprascapular vein is not very variable. In nearly 20% of people, there may be 2 suprascapular veins lying next to each other. In a very small minority, there may be three.

Function 
The suprascapular vein drains the posterior region around the scapula.

References

External links 
 Nervous system

Veins of the head and neck